December 15 - Eastern Orthodox liturgical calendar - December 17

All fixed commemorations below celebrated on December 29 by Eastern Orthodox Churches on the Old Calendar.

For December 16, Orthodox Churches on the Old Calendar commemorate the Saints listed on December 3.

Saints
 Prophet Haggai (Aggaeus) (500 BC)  (see also: December 4, July 4)
 Martyr Marinus of Rome (283)
 Martyrs Promus (Probus) and Hilary, by the sword.
 Saint Memnon, Archbishop of Ephesus (c. 440)
 Saint Modestus II, Patriarch of Jerusalem (634) (see also December 18 - Modestus I)
 Saint Simeon, Archbishop of Antioch (834-840)
 Blessed Empress Theophania of Byzantium (893), wife of Byzantine Emperor Leo VI the Wise.
 Saint Nicholas Chrysoberges, Patriarch of Constantinople (995)

Pre-Schism Western saints
 Martyrs Valentine, Concordius, Navalis and Agricola, martyrs venerated in Ravenna in Italy. (c. 305)
 Women Martyrs of North-West Africa, a great number of women martyred under Hunneric, Arian King of the Vandals (482)
 Saint Dabheog (Beoc, Beanus, Mobeoc), founder of a monastery on an island in Lough Derg in Donegal in Ireland (5th century)
 Saint Ado of Vienne (875)
 Saint Adelaide of Italy, daughter of the King of Burgundy, she was married to Lothair II of Italy, became a nun (999)

Post-Schism Orthodox saints
 Saint Sophia of Suzdal, nun (Solomonia Saburova), wife of Grand Duke Basil III of Moscow (1542)

New martyrs and confessors
 New Hieromartyr Vladimir Alexeyev, Priest, of Okhansk (1918)
 New Hieromartyr Arcadius (Ostalsky), Bishop of Bezhetsk (1937)
 New Hieromartyr Alexander Kolokolov, Protopresbyter of Tver (1937)
 New Hieromartyr Paul Favoritov, Priest of Tver (1937)
 New Hieromartyr Macarius Smirnov, Priest-monk of Tver (1937)
 New Hieromartyr Peter Zinoviev, Priest of Tver (1937)
 New Hieromartyr Theodosius Boldiriev, Priest of Tver (1937)
 New Hieromartyrs Priests Elias Cheredeev, and Vladimir Damaskinus (1937)

Icon gallery

Notes

References

Sources
 December 16/29. Orthodox Calendar (PRAVOSLAVIE.RU).
 December 29 / December 16. HOLY TRINITY RUSSIAN ORTHODOX CHURCH (A parish of the Patriarchate of Moscow).
 December 16. OCA - The Lives of the Saints.
 The Autonomous Orthodox Metropolia of Western Europe and the Americas (ROCOR). St. Hilarion Calendar of Saints for the year of our Lord 2004. St. Hilarion Press (Austin, TX). p. 94.
 December 16. Latin Saints of the Orthodox Patriarchate of Rome.
 The Roman Martyrology. Transl. by the Archbishop of Baltimore. Last Edition, According to the Copy Printed at Rome in 1914. Revised Edition, with the Imprimatur of His Eminence Cardinal Gibbons. Baltimore: John Murphy Company, 1916.
Greek Sources
 Great Synaxaristes:  16 ΔΕΚΕΜΒΡΙΟΥ. ΜΕΓΑΣ ΣΥΝΑΞΑΡΙΣΤΗΣ.
  Συναξαριστής. 16 Δεκεμβρίου. ECCLESIA.GR. (H ΕΚΚΛΗΣΙΑ ΤΗΣ ΕΛΛΑΔΟΣ). 
Russian Sources
  29 декабря (16 декабря). Православная Энциклопедия под редакцией Патриарха Московского и всея Руси Кирилла (электронная версия). (Orthodox Encyclopedia - Pravenc.ru).
  16 декабря (ст.ст.) 29 декабря 2013 (нов. ст.). Русская Православная Церковь Отдел внешних церковных связей. (DECR).

December in the Eastern Orthodox calendar